Sir John Jeremie (19 August 1795 – 23 April 1841) was a British judge and diplomat, Chief Justice of Saint Lucia and Governor of Sierra Leone. He was given an award in 1836 for advancing "negro freedom" after accusing the judges in Mauritius of bias. He understood that colour prejudice and slavery were different problems.

Biography
Jeremie was born to John Jeremie, a barrister, on the British island of Guernsey in 1795. He went to Blundell's School in Devon before studying law in Dijon, France. His father died in Malta in 1810. He was called to the bar in his home island where he was successful, and published a posthumous legal work of his father's.

St Lucia
Jeremie was appointed in 1824 to be Chief Justice of Saint Lucia, a post he held until 1831. During this time he was called upon to administer the slave laws that applied in the British Empire at that time. Although the slave trade had been abolished in the British Empire, slavery per se continued to be legal in some form during this time. The issue of slavery continued to be a subject that Jeremie was associated with throughout his life. He wrote four essays on Colonial Slavery pointing out the problems of slave communities and the improvements made in their conditions in Saint Lucia. He also advised on how to end slavery altogether. These publications were brought to the British public's attention and are thought to have contributed to slavery's abolition.

Mauritius
Jeremie was appointed the procureur and advocate general of the island of Mauritius in 1832, but this was a very difficult appointment. In 1830, the Governor Sir Charles Colville reported that there was a great deal of bad feeling against His Majesty's Government continues to prevail and shew itself here… there is an almost total cessation in the payment of taxes... He arrived there in June 1832, and the hostility to him as a known abolitionist was very difficult to handle. It took an armed escort to get him off his boat after trying to leave for two days. The judges refused to turn up to appoint him, and he was attacked by a mob in the street. Sir Charles Colville ordered him home, but he was sent out again when he arrived back in Great Britain. He arrived again the following year but there were continued charges about his and others' behaviour. In 1833 he charged the judges with bias and involvement with slavery. The governor failed to support him, and he resigned again and left on 28 October 1833. His behaviour was justified in his 1835 report –  "Recent Events at Mauritius".

Jeremie could see that slavery would be illegal soon, and he predicted that other existing laws predicated on colour prejudice would be a source of further ill feeling. He petitioned to have the respective laws revoked.

Ceylon
On 2 October 1835 he was appointed second puisne judge of the Ceylon Supreme Court, and took up the position on 9 December 1836. In the same year he was honoured by the Anti-Slavery Society with a plaque that read:

 
Jeremie was in London to attend the World's anti-slavery convention on 12 June 1840.
With some premonition, Jeremie was to write later of his time in Ceylon, when others were worried that he had accepted a position as a Governor in Sierra Leone:

London
The portrait above shows him in a detail from this painting made to commemorate the event which attracted delegates from America, France, Haiti, Australia, Ireland, Jamaica and Barbados.

Sierra Leone
He was appointed Governor of Sierra Leone on 15 October 1840 which was both an honour and a health risk. His confidence is apparent in the quotation above where he notes that he survived six years in Ceylon and outlived the other judges appointed to the Supreme Court there. His only daughter Catherine married Captain Taylor in March 1841. He was knighted on 15 November 1840, before leaving for Africa. He died at Port Loko in Sierra Leone of a fever after only a few months in Africa. He is buried in Circular Road Cemetery.

Works
He edited his father's legal work (in French)
"Negro Emancipation and African Civilization" Open letter to, June 1840

References

1795 births
1841 deaths
British diplomats
Knights Bachelor
People educated at Blundell's School
Guernsey people
Saint Lucian judges
English abolitionists
British Windward Islands judges
Puisne Justices of the Supreme Court of Ceylon
Governors of Sierra Leone
British Mauritius people
British Mauritius judges